Gorgyra aburae, the swollen leaf sitter, is a butterfly in the family Hesperiidae. It is found in Sierra Leone, Liberia, Ivory Coast, Ghana, Nigeria and western Cameroon. The habitat consists of forests.

References

Butterflies described in 1879
Erionotini
Butterflies of Africa